King Faisal Naval Base (Arabic: قاعدة الملك فيصل البحرية) (OEJF) is a Royal Saudi Navy base located in  Jeddah, Saudi Arabia.  It is home to the Navy’s Red Sea Fleet, the Western Fleet, on the western coast of the country.

References

See also

 List of things named after Saudi Kings
 List of military installations in Saudi Arabia

Base
Airports in Saudi Arabia
Military installations of Saudi Arabia
Installations of the United States Air Force in Saudi Arabia